The 1999–2000 European Challenge Cup was the fourth year of the European Challenge Cup, the second tier rugby union cup competition below the Heineken Cup. The tournament was held between November 1999 and May 2000.

Pool stage

Pool 1

Pool 2

Pool 3

Pool 4

Pool 5

Pool 6

Pool 7

* Agen deducted two points for fielding non-registered players in two matches.

Knockout stage

Quarter-finals

Semi-finals

Final

See also
European Challenge Cup

References

 
1999–2000 rugby union tournaments for clubs
1999-2000
1999–2000 in European rugby union
1999–2000 in English rugby union
1999–2000 in French rugby union
1999–2000 in Irish rugby union
1999–2000 in Italian rugby union
1999–2000 in Romanian rugby union
1999–2000 in Welsh rugby union
1999–2000 in Spanish rugby union